Hospital and Rehabilitation for Disabled Children is a hospital in Banepa, Nepal. It was founded in 1985 with the support of Terre des Hommes (TdH) of Switzerland. The ownership of this program was transferred to the Friends of the Disabled (FOD) a Nepalese non-governmental organization in 1992.

Awards and recognition
 World's Top Child Health Award to Prof. (Dr.) Ashok Kumar Banskota in 2011 By World Of Children
 Stars Impact Award 2014 in health in Asia Pacific region to Prof. (Dr.) Ashok Kumar Banskota
 World of Children Alumni Award 2016 to Prof. (Dr.) Ashok Kumar Banskota

See also
List of hospitals in Nepal

References

External links
 

Hospitals in Nepal
Medical education in Nepal
Teaching hospitals
Organisations based in Kathmandu
1985 establishments in Nepal